= Birgena =

Town in ancient Phrygia

Coordinates: 39°02′47″N 30°11′07″E

Birgena was a town of ancient Phrygia, inhabited in Roman and Byzantine times. Its name does not occur in ancient authors, but is inferred from epigraphic and other evidence.

Its site is tentatively located near Murathanlar in Asiatic Turkey.
